Vladimir Grigoryevich Benediktov ((17 November [5 o.s.] 1807, in Saint Petersburg, Russian Empire – 26 April [14 o.s.] 1873, in Saint Petersburg, Russian Empire) was a Russian romantic poet and translator, of Goethe,  Schiller, Barbier, Gautier and Mickiewicz, among others.

Biography
Vladimir Benediktov was born in Saint Petersburg and spent his early years in Petrozavodsk where his father, a minor nobleman and a descendant of an old clergymen's family received a post in a local governor's office. After studying in the Olonets gymnasium, he joined the Second Cadet Corps military school in Saint Petersburg in 1821. After five years of the army service (in the course of which he took part in suppressing the 1830 Polish Uprising) Benediktov retired and in 1832 joined the Ministry of Finance as a clerk, giving his spare time to three hobbies: mathematics, astronomy and writing poetry.

Benediktov's debut poetry collection released in 1835 brought him success and fame; Vasily Zhukovsky referred to it as a masterpiece and Alexander Pushkin was known to have praised it. Yet, Vissarion Belinsky, while crediting the author with being technically impressive, expressed reservations about his peculiar  mix of garish Romantic imagery and prosaic details. In 1838 Benediktov's second book became a best-seller, with 3 thousand copies sold, a huge number for the Russian literary market of the time.

In 1860-1870s Benediktov's poetry became less flashy and more introspective, justifying the tag "thinking man's poet", Stepan Shevyryov has once given him. In 1855 Benediktov became a Saint Petersburg Imperial Academy of Sciences' member. In 1856 The Complete Beneditov in 3 volumes came out, re-issued and expanded a year later and featuring a foreword by editor Yakov Polonsky.

Benediktov is considered one of the most prominent Russian translators of the 19th century (of Goethe,  Friedrich Schiller, Henri Auguste Barbier, Pierre Jules Théophile Gautier and  Adam Mickiewicz, Lord Byron, Shakespeare, among others). His most successful translations were those of Pierre Jules Théophile Gautier and Victor Hugo, two masters he felt close aesthetic affinity to.

References 

Poets from the Russian Empire
Male writers from the Russian Empire
Russian male poets
1807 births
1873 deaths
Writers from Saint Petersburg
19th-century poets
19th-century translators from the Russian Empire
19th-century male writers from the Russian Empire
Translators of Johann Wolfgang von Goethe